Shi Quan Da Bu Wan, also known as Shiquan Dabu teapills, is a Chinese classic herbal formula. In Japanese kampo, it is known as "Jūzen-daiho-tō" (十全大補湯   じゅうぜんだいほとう) (it is also known as Kampo #48). It is commonly made into Chinese patent medicine.  It is composed of two famous formulas which tonify the blood (si wu wan) and the qi (si jun zi wan) plus the addition of huang qi and rou gui.

Variations
The formula was published in the "Tai Ping Imperial Grace Formulary" (tài píng huì mín hé jì jú fāng, T: 太平惠民和劑局方, S: 太平惠民和剂局方) in 992CE. 

There are many variations of the formula proportions. Each maker of Chinese patent medicine changes the proportions of the herbs slightly. The proportions in the Japanese kampo formula are standardized, however. Some herbs may be changed also. For example, rén shēn (ginseng root) may be replaced with dǎng shēn ("poor man's ginseng").

The formula was also changed slightly when it was borrowed as a Japanese kampo formula. Some Chinese species of herbs were replaced with herbs found in Japan. For example, bái zhú (Atractylodes macrocephala) was replaced with cāng zhú (Atractylodes lancea).

Chinese classic herbal formula

Japanese kampo formula

See also
Chinese classic herbal formula
Chinese patent medicine
Chinese classic herbal formula
Kampo list
Kampo herb list

External links
Biographies of the creators of many Chinese classic herbal formula
Jūzen-daiho-tō (Kampo #48) 

Traditional Chinese medicine pills